Clavipectoral may refer to:

 Clavipectoral fascia
 Clavipectoral triangle